Hypotia is a genus of moths of the family Pyralidae described by Philipp Christoph Zeller in 1847.

Species
Hypotia aglossalis (Hampson, 1906)
Hypotia argentalis (Hampson, 1900)
Hypotia bertazii (Turati, 1926)
Hypotia bleusei (Oberthür, 1888)
Hypotia bolinalis (Walker, 1859)
Hypotia brandbergensis Leraut, 2007
Hypotia brandti (Amsel, 1949)
Hypotia chretieni (D. Lucas, 1910)
Hypotia colchicalis (Herrich-Schäffer, 1851)
Hypotia colchicaloides (Amsel, 1949)
Hypotia concatenalis Lederer, 1858
Hypotia corticalis (Denis & Schiffermüller, 1775)
Hypotia cribellalis Erschoff, 1874
Hypotia decembralis Leraut, 2007
Hypotia diehlalis (Viette, 1953)
Hypotia difformis (Falkovitsh, 1976)
Hypotia dinteri Grünberg, 1910
Hypotia eberti Leraut, 2007
Hypotia griveaudi Leraut, 2004
Hypotia grisescens (Warren, 1914)
Hypotia infulalis Lederer, 1858
Hypotia khorgosalis (Ragonot, 1891)
Hypotia leonalis (Oberthür, 1887)
Hypotia leucographalis (Hampson, 1900)
Hypotia littoralis Leraut, 2009
Hypotia lobalis (Chrétien, 1915)
Hypotia longidentalis (Rothschild, 1913)
Hypotia mahafalyalis Leraut, 2009
Hypotia massilialis (Duponchel, 1832)
Hypotia mavromoustakisi (Rebel, 1928)
Hypotia metasialis (Amsel, 1954)
Hypotia meyi Leraut, 2007
Hypotia miegi (Ragonot, 1895)
Hypotia mimicralis (Amsel, 1951)
Hypotia mineti Leraut, 2004
Hypotia muscosalis (Rebel, 1917)
Hypotia myalis (Rothschild, 1913)
Hypotia namibiensis Leraut, 2007
Hypotia noctua (Falkovitsh, 1976)
Hypotia numidalis (Hampson, 1900)
Hypotia opiparalis (Swinhoe, 1890)
Hypotia opisma (Falkovitsh, 1976)
Hypotia ornata Druce, 1902
Hypotia orphna (Falkovitsh, 1976)
Hypotia oxodontalis (Hampson, 1900)
Hypotia pectinalis (Herrich-Schäffer, 1838)
Hypotia persinualis (Hampson, 1900)
Hypotia perstrigata (Fawcett, 1916)
Hypotia proximalis Christoph, 1882
Hypotia rectangula (Amsel, 1949)
Hypotia saramitoi (Guillermet, 1996)
Hypotia seyrigalis (Viette, 1953)
Hypotia sinaica (Rebel, 1903)
Hypotia speciosalis Christoph, 1885
Hypotia syrtalis (Ragonot, 1887)
Hypotia theopoldi (Amsel, 1956)
Hypotia viettei Leraut, 2004
Hypotia vulgaris Butler, 1881

References

Hypotiini
Pyralidae genera
Taxa named by Philipp Christoph Zeller